Promeliboeus is a genus of beetles in the family Buprestidae, the jewel beetles. They are native to Africa. Some species have been observed feeding on the flowers of plants in the aster family. These beetles are a few millimeters long except P. colossus, which can be over a centimeter in length.

Species include:

 Promeliboeus braunsi Obenberger, 1945
 Promeliboeus colossus Bellamy, 1989
 Promeliboeus namaquensis Bellamy, 1989
 Promeliboeus parallelicollis Obenberger, 1931
 Promeliboeus strandi Obenberger, 1924

References

Buprestidae genera
Beetles of Africa